Public bank can refer to:
Public bank
Public Bank Berhad
Public Bank FC
Public Bank (Hong Kong)
Public sector banks in India